Contra is a band from Cleveland.

Discography

Albums
 Deny Everything (CD) - RobustFellow Productions, Shifty Records (USA), 2017

References

American doom metal musical groups
Heavy metal musical groups from Ohio
Musical groups from Cleveland
Musical groups established in 2015
Musical groups disestablished in 2015
2015 establishments in Ohio